Charlotte Lee Morgan (born June 5, 1988) is an America], former professional softball pitcher and current Head Coach for Cal State Northridge. She played college softball for Alabama from 2007 to 2010, where she is the career leader for the school in RBIs, also ranking top-15 in the NCAA Division I. She was also named a four-time all-conference honoree and twice named SEC Player of the Year. Morgan was the No. 1 draft pick in the 2010 National Pro Fastpitch Senior Draft, beginning her career with The USSSA Pride based in Kissimmee, Florida, winning a title in 2010. In 2020, Morgan was named the head coach of the California State University, Northridge softball team after previously working at several colleges as a pitching coach.

Early life and education 
Morgan was born in Riverside, California and grew up in Moreno Valley, California. She is the daughter of Chris Morgan and Lori Morgan, with three brothers and two sisters. She started playing softball at the age of nine.

She attended Moreno Valley High School for three years and was a recognized scholar-athlete. She continued on to neighboring Valley View High School during her senior year.

In 2003, as a freshman in high school, Morgan received first-team All-League honors, as well as first-team Team All-County honors in softball. She was honored as the league MVP and Rookie of the Year. In addition to softball, Morgan played basketball and was named Outstanding Basketball Player and team MVP on the 2003 league championship team.

In 2004, in her sophomore year, Morgan continued playing softball and was named a first-team All-League honoree. In 2005, as a junior in high school, Morgan received second-team All-League honors in softball.

In 2006, as a senior at Valley View High School, Morgan was a first-team All-League honoree, earned first-team Team All-County honors, as well as Athlete of the Year and the league's Most Valuable Player. She graduated magna cum laude, finishing 13th in her class.

College softball career
Morgan attended the University of Alabama, choosing Alabama over both UCLA and Texas. Morgan was one of the most highly decorated incoming freshman in Crimson Tide softball history.

In 2009 and 2010, Morgan was named the Southeastern Conference (SEC) Player of the Year, becoming the second player in SEC history to receive this honor twice in her career. She has made the first-team All-SEC for the 2010 season.

During her collegiate career, Morgan earned athletic awards including the USA Softball Collegiate Player of the Year Top 10 finalist and ESPN Magazine's Academic third-team All-American. Morgan ended the 2010 regular season with a 7–2 pitching record and a .350 batting average as well as leading the team with 16 home runs. Morgan was a key player for the University of Alabama's offense, becoming the first player in Crimson Tide's history with three 50 or more RBI seasons.

She led Alabama in all three major hitting categories in her final season, pacing the Tide with a .406 batting average, 11 home runs and 59 RBI. She also led the team with a .673 slugging percentage and a .505 on-base percentage.

In 2010, Morgan received the Lowe's Senior CLASS Award. The honor is presented annually to the most outstanding senior player in NCAA Division I softball. The recipient is chosen by a nationwide vote of Division I softball coaches, media, and fans. The announcement and presentation was June 3, 2010, during the opening day of the NCAA Women's College World Series in Oklahoma City.

Professional softball career 
On February 10, 2010, the National Pro Fastpitch Senior Draft was held. Morgan was the first player chosen, thereby beginning her professional softball career with the USSSA Florida Pride. She was the highest draft pick ever from among members of the Crimson Tide, and the eighth player in Alabama history to be drafted in the professional league.

Following the draft, Morgan stated, "It is an honor to be able to have the opportunity to further my career. To be able to play professionally has always been a goal of mine. I wouldn't be in this position if it weren't for the coaching staff and my teammates at Alabama.

Upon joining the Akron Racers in June 2013 Morgan stated, “I am really excited and blessed to be able to join the Akron Racers family,” commented Morgan. “Ready to help in any way to lead us to a championship this year.”

Coaching career
Morgan was an assistant pitching coach at Maryland from 2011 to 2013 and at Georgia Tech from 2014 to 2015. From 2016 to 2017, she was pitching coach at Oklahoma State. After two seasons at Oklahoma State, Morgan became an assistant at UT Arlington. In December 2020, Morgan was announced as the new softball coach at California State University, Northridge.

Career statistics

External links

References

1988 births
Akron Racers players
Alabama Crimson Tide softball players
Cal State Northridge Matadors softball coaches
Georgia Tech Yellow Jackets softball coaches
Living people
Maryland Terrapins softball coaches
Oklahoma State Cowgirls softball coaches
People from Moreno Valley, California
Softball coaches from California
Softball players from California
Sportspeople from Riverside, California
UT Arlington Mavericks coaches